Teriipaia is a Polynesian surname. Notable people with the surname include:

Mita Teriipaia, French Polynesian minister for culture and the arts
Tarita Teriipaia (born 1941), French Polynesian actress, wife of Marlon Brando

Surnames of Oceanian origin